"Geisha Girl" is a song written by Lawton Williams, sung by Hank Locklin, and released on the RCA Victor label (catalog no. 20-6984). In August 1957, it peaked at No. 4 on Billboards country and western best seller's chart. It spent 39 weeks on the charts and was also ranked No. 19 on Billboards 1957 year-end country and western retail best seller chart.

Charts

Weekly charts

See also
 "Lost to a Geisha Girl"
 Billboard Top Country & Western Records of 1957

References

1957 singles
1957 songs
Hank Locklin songs
Song recordings produced by Chet Atkins
RCA Victor singles
Songs written by Lawton Williams